The 1990 Japanese Grand Prix was a Formula One motor race held on 21 October 1990 at Suzuka. It was the fifteenth and penultimate race of the 1990 Formula One season. It was the 16th Japanese Grand Prix and the 6th held at Suzuka.

The race saw a first-corner collision between World Championship rivals Brazilian driver Ayrton Senna and French driver Alain Prost, the second consecutive year that the World Championship had been decided by a collision between the two at the same track. The collision immediately put both cars out of the race and secured Senna his second World Championship, a reversal of fortunes from the 1989 Japanese Grand Prix, where the collision had secured the championship for Prost.

The race saw a best result to that point for the Benetton Formula team, with their drivers Brazilian veteran Nelson Piquet and his protégé Roberto Moreno finishing first and second in their Benetton B190s. It was back to back wins for Benetton in Japan after the team's win the previous year. Japanese driver Aguri Suzuki scored a career-best result for himself, the Larrousse team and the Lamborghini engine, finishing third in his Lola LC90.

With Ferrari scoring no points after Nigel Mansell's retirement, the McLaren team secured their sixth and third consecutive Constructors' Championship.

Pre-race
Before the race, Brabham announced that they would use Yamaha engines for 1991, while  Footwork announced a Porsche engine deal for 1991 and retained both their 1990 drivers, Alex Caffi and Michele Alboreto. Prior to the race, the Life Racing Engines and EuroBrun teams withdrew from the sport. EuroBrun's Roberto Moreno joined the Benetton team replacing the previous year's race winner Alessandro Nannini, who was unable to attend the race following a helicopter crash that also ended his Formula One career, one week after the Spanish Grand Prix.

Jean Alesi did not start after suffering a neck injury during Friday's practice. As his grid position was left empty, this was the third consecutive race to have only 25 starters instead of the usual 26.

Nigel Mansell also announced a U-turn on his decision to retire by making public his agreement to join Williams-Renault for two years from 1991 after being given assurances from Frank Williams, Patrick Head and Renault that they could deliver him a car in which he could win a World Championship and that he would be the team's undisputed #1 driver. On Saturday Soichiro Honda, the founder of Honda, met Ayrton Senna in the McLaren pit.

Qualifying

Qualifying report
After the withdrawal of the EuroBrun and Life teams, there was no need for a pre-qualifying session as only 30 cars remained in the event. The four drivers relieved of the necessity to pre-qualify, Yannick Dalmas, Gabriele Tarquini (both AGS), Olivier Grouillard (Osella) and Bertrand Gachot (Coloni) were ultimately the four drivers that failed to qualify for the race. Gachot crashed heavily in the Friday session. Roberto Moreno, who had left EuroBrun and joined Benetton, qualified easily in ninth position.

Qualifying classification

Race

Race report
Ayrton Senna qualified on pole, but was unhappy with the  dirty side of the track it was situated on, arguing that pole should always be on the racing line. He and Gerhard Berger then went to the Japanese stewards, to request a change of position of pole to the cleaner left side of the track. The stewards initially agreed but an injunction by FISA president Jean Marie Balestre later that night rejected the decision and the original pole position remained on the dirtier right side of the track. In addition, the FIA had warned that crossing the yellow line of the pit exit on the right to better position oneself at the first corner would not be permitted, further infuriating Senna.

At the start, Prost took the lead, but Senna attempted to take the inside line into the first corner. The two drivers made contact, sending both off the track and into instant retirement. The crash meant that Senna had clinched the Drivers' Championship for a second time, as with one race left in the season, Prost could not overtake his points tally. Benetton-Ford's dominance of the podium prevented Ferrari from scoring enough points to stop McLaren clinching its sixth constructors' title.

The two discussed the event afterwards, with Senna claiming it was not how he wanted it but how it had to be. Prost was infuriated by this, and described the move as "disgusting" and Senna as "a man without value". He later said that he almost retired from the sport instantly after the incident.

The pair went on to win one more championship each and eventually reconciled their differences in their final Grand Prix together.

After the collision, the race proceeded with Gerhard Berger's McLaren MP4/5B leading and Nigel Mansell's Ferrari 641 second.  Berger spun off at the first corner on lap 2, on sand thrown onto the track by the Senna/Prost collision, leaving Mansell to lead the race from the two Benettons of Piquet and Moreno. Anticipating that Benetton would follow their usual strategy of not making a pit stop, Mansell built up a gap until he pitted for tyres at the end of lap 26. After a quick stop, he left his box with heavy wheelspin, and a driveshaft failed.  The Ferrari pulled over at the end of the pit lane and retired. Piquet inherited the lead and retained it until the chequered flag, with his teammate Moreno following closely. Aguri Suzuki also drove a non-stop race, finishing third, the first Japanese driver to do so. The two Williams FW13B-Renaults of Riccardo Patrese and Thierry Boutsen finished fourth and fifth, while Satoru Nakajima finished sixth in a Tyrrell 019, the second Japanese driver in the points.

, this was the last race where no European driver finished the race on the podium, two South American drivers and an Asian driver filled the top three positions. It was also the only race where the Larrousse team scored a podium finish, during their eight seasons of competing in Formula One, and the first and only podium finish for the Lamborghini V12 engine in Formula One. Moreover, it was also the last of Brazil's eleven one-twos in Formula One, the only one featuring Piquet and Moreno – of the other ten, eight featured Piquet and Senna and the other two, Emerson Fittipaldi and José Carlos Pace. Aguri Suzuki's podium finish was the first for a Japanese driver (later matched by Takuma Sato and Kamui Kobayashi) and the last for a Japanese driver at his home race until Kamui Kobayashi did so at the 2012 Japanese Grand Prix.

Race classification

Championship standings after the race
 Bold Text indicates World Champions.

Drivers' Championship standings

Constructors' Championship standings

 Note: Only the top five positions are included for both sets of standings.

References

Japanese Grand Prix
Japanese Grand Prix
Grand Prix
Formula One controversies